This article gives an overview of the medal winners and their respective results at the 2013 National Games of China. There were 31 sports and 350 disciplines.

Aquatics

Diving

Swimming

Synchronized swimming

Water polo

Archery

Athletics

Baseball

Basketball

Beach Volleyball

Boxing

Canoeing

Cycling

Equestrian

Fencing

Football

Golf

Gymnastics

Artistic gymnastics

Rhythmic gymnastics

Trampoline

Handball

Field Hockey

Judo

Martial Arts

Modern Pentathlon

Rowing

Rugby Union

Sailing

Shooting

Softball

Table Tennis

Taekwondo

Tennis

Triathlon

Volleyball

Weightlifting

Men

Women

Wrestling

2013 National Games of China